Up in the Attic is the fourth studio album by American rock band Alien Ant Farm. The album is identical to 3rd Draft with the addition of one new track, and radio promo, "Forgive & Forget". It's considered a commercial flop in the U.S. because of little support for the album, no officially released single ("Forgive & Forget" was only released as a promo to radio and received little airplay), and no tour. The album debuted at number 114 on the Billboard 200, dropped to number 198 in its next week, and fell off completely in its third week.

The song "Around the Block" had a music video recently released, and is available on iTunes.

The album cover features references to songs of past albums, as well as songs from the album itself: Smooth Criminal, Movies, S.S. Recognize, Pink Tea, Rubber Mallet, San Sebastian & Crickets.

Track listing

There are two hidden tracks appended to the last song: "Beehive" and "Album End", which were known as "Tragedy" and "Say Something", respectively, on 3rd Draft.

Two unreleased songs from the recording sessions are "All Your Crimes" and "Bellman".

Personnel
Joe Hill - guitar
Mike Cosgrove - drums
Dryden Mitchell - vocals
Tye Zamora - bass

Charts

3rd Draft

3rd Draft is the name given by fans to Alien Ant Farm's third album. The naming relates to a piece of the artwork that says 3rd Draft; since then, the band has referred to the album by that name as well. Due to issues with Geffen, it was never commercially released. It was, however, made available by the band during the Alien Ant Farm Summer 2005 Tour.

Track listing:
 "Bad Morning"  – 3:42
 "What I Feel Is Mine"  – 2:58
 "It Could Happen"  – 3:53
 "Around the Block"  – 3:16
 "San Sebastian"  – 3:05
 "Lord Knows"  – 3:06
 "Getting Closer"  – 3:48
 "Crickets"  – 4:36
 "Supreme Lifestyle"  – 3:56
 "Consti2tion"  – 3:38
 "State of Emergency"  – 3:29
 "Sleepwalker"  – 3:06
 "She's Only Evil"  – 8:26

There are two hidden tracks appended to the last song: "Tragedy" and "Say Something", which were known as "Beehive" and "Album End", respectively, on Up in the Attic.

References

External links

Up in the Attic at YouTube (streamed copy where licensed)

Alien Ant Farm albums
2006 albums